Modern Times may refer to modern history.

Modern Times may also refer to:

Music
 Modern Times (band), a band from Luxembourg 
 Modern Times (Al Stewart album), a 1975 album by Al Stewart
 Modern Times (Bob Dylan album), a 2006 album by Bob Dylan
 Modern Times (IU album), a 2013 Korean album by South Korean singer IU
 Modern Times (Jefferson Starship album), a 1981 album by Jefferson Starship
 Modern Times (Latin Quarter album), a 1985 album by Latin Quarter
 "Modern Times" (song), a 2004 song by J-five
 "Modern Times", a 1983 song by Prism from the album Beat Street

Other media
 Modern Times (film), a 1936 Charlie Chaplin film
 Modern Times (novel) (Wenming Xiaoshi), a 1903 Chinese novel
 Modern Times: A History of the World from the 1920s to the 1980s, a 1984 book by Paul Johnson
 Modern Times: Photography in the 20th Century, an exhibition held in winter 2014–2015 at the Rijksmuseum, Amsterdam
 Modern Times Group, a Swedish media company
 Les Temps modernes, a French journal

Other uses
 Tiempos Modernos, a Mexican political group that is part of the National Assembly of the Socialist Left
 Utopian Community of Modern Times, an anarchist individualist community in 19th-century New York state

See also
 Early modern period
 Modernity
 Modern (disambiguation)
 Contemporary (disambiguation)